Bisheh Khazan (also Romanized as Bīsheh Khazān; also known as Bīsh Khazān) is a village in Pishkuh-e Zalaqi Rural District, Besharat District, Aligudarz County, Lorestan Province, Iran. At the 2006 census, its population was 33, in 6 families.

References 

Towns and villages in Aligudarz County